Erick da Costa Farias (born 2 October 2000), known as Erick Pulga, is a Brazilian professional footballer who plays as a forward for Ferroviário, on loan from Atlético Cearense.

Club career
Born in Fortaleza, Ceará, Erick Pulga joined River's youth setup in 2019 from hometown side . In January 2020, after impressing in the year's Copa São Paulo de Futebol Júnior, he was promoted to the former's first team squad, but moved on loan to Fortaleza on 12 February, and joined their under-20 team.

Ahead of the 2021 season, Erick Pulga signed for Atlético Cearense and helped in their first-ever promotion to the Série C by scoring seven league goals. On 3 December of that year, he was loaned to Madureira for the 2022 Campeonato Carioca.

On 21 May 2022, Erick Pulga joined Campinense in the third division, also on loan; after the club's relegation, he ended the campaign at Maracanã. On 8 November, still owned by Atlético, he agreed to a deal with Ferroviário.

Erick Pulga was a spotlight of Ferroviário during the early stages of the 2023 season, scoring in a regular basis. On 13 March 2023, ge revealed that he agreed to a pre-contract with Ceará in the Série B.

Career statistics

Honours
Campinense
Campeonato Paraibano: 2022

References

2000 births
Living people
People from Fortaleza
Sportspeople from Ceará
Brazilian footballers
Association football forwards
Campeonato Brasileiro Série C players
Campeonato Brasileiro Série D players
FC Atlético Cearense players
Madureira Esporte Clube players
Campinense Clube players
Ferroviário Atlético Clube (CE) players